Jennifer Dailey-Provost is an American politician serving as a member of the Utah House of Representatives from the 24th district. Elected in November 2018, she assumed office on January 1, 2019.

Education
Dailey-Provost earned a Bachelor of Science degree in marketing from the David Eccles School of Business at the University of Utah and an MBA from Westminster College.

Career 
Dailey-Provost was executive director of Utah Academy of Family Physicians, where she lobbied for family medicine and primary care.

In the 2018 general election for the Utah House of Representatives, she defeated Republican candidate Scott Rosenbush, with 77% of the vote.

Political Positions and Significant Legislation

In 2019, Rep. Dailey-Provost sponsored end-of-life legislation in the 2019 legislative session, but the bill did not receive a hearing. In 2022, she tried again, but the bill was defeated 2-9 in committee.

In 2021, Rep. Dailey-Provost sponsored a bill that would "allow women held in jails to be able to stay on their prescribed birth control, with the goal to prevent unwanted pregnancies." The bill passed the legislature and was signed by Governor Cox into Law.

References

Living people
University of Utah alumni
Westminster College (Utah) alumni
21st-century American politicians
21st-century American women politicians
Women state legislators in Utah
Democratic Party members of the Utah House of Representatives
Year of birth missing (living people)